Georgia State Route 14 Connector may refer to:

 Georgia State Route 14 Connector (LaGrange 1965–1976): a former connector route of State Route 14 that existed in LaGrange
 Georgia State Route 14 Connector (LaGrange): a connector route of State Route 14 that exists in LaGrange
 Georgia State Route 14 Connector (Red Oak–College Park): a connector route of State Route 14 that exists in Red Oak and College Park

014 Connector